Hermina Pipinić (1 May 1928 – 19 December 2020) was a Croatian actress. She attended an acting school in Zagreb and debuted on stage in 1948 at the First Drama Theatre in Zagreb.

Filmography

Film roles 

 Milioni na otoku (1955) as Ivica's sister
 Cesta duga godinu dana (1958) as Agneza
 Hvezda jede na jig (1958)
 Vjetar je stao pred zoru (1959) as Andja
 Piko (1959) as Mom
 Kota 905 (1960) as Jelka
 Dan četrnaesti (1961) as Marija
 Square of Violence (1961)
 Ne diraj u srecu (1961)
 Karolina Riječka (1961) as Marija
 Prozvan je i V-3 (1962) as Čvrga's Mother
 La steppa (1962) as Olga Ivanovna
 Sjenka slave (1962) as Pripita i razocarana zena
 Opasni put (1963) as Božena
 Dvostruki obruč (1963) as Maria
 Ljudi i neljudi (1963, TV Movie)
 Kandidat smrti (1963, TV Movie)
 Jedna od onih godina (1963, TV Movie)
 Usluga tačna i solidna (1964, TV Movie)
 Doktorova noć (1964, TV Movie)
 Druga strana medalje (1965) as Lover
 Old Surehand (1965) as Molly
 Glasam za ljubav (1965)
 Sedmi kontinent (1966) as Boy's Mother
 Kineski zid (1967, TV Movie)
 Breza (1967) as Jaga
 Protest (1967) as Molnar's Wife
 Pošalji čovjeka u pola dva (1967) as Rita Batić
 Zrno do zrna (1968, Short)
 Rastrgani (1968, TV Movie)
 Dobro jutro, gospodine Karlek (1970, TV Movie)
 Jana (1970, TV Movie) as Jana
 Kainov znak (1970, TV Movie)
 Mora (1971)
 Teret dokaza (1972, TV Movie)
 Mala majka (1973)
 Živjeti od ljubavi (1973) as Nastavnica
 Kronika jednog zločina (1973)
 Muke po Mati (1975) as Rahela
  (1976) as Ivo's Mother
 Pucanj (1977) as Grgec's Wife
 Ludi dani (1977) as Janja
 Akcija stadion (1977) as Mrs. Mraović
 Ćutanje profesora Martića (1978, TV Movie)
 Usvojenje (1978, Short)
 Karmine (1978, TV Movie)
 God (1980, TV Movie)
 Obiteljski album (1981, TV Movie) as Mother
 Gosti iz galaksije (1981) as Stela's Mother
 Večernja zvona (1986) as Meira's Mother
 Terevenka (1987, TV Movie)
 Kad ftičeki popevleju (1988, TV Movie)
 Krvopijci (1989) as Tamara Baumfeld

Television roles 
 Maratonci (1968)
 La kermesse des brigands (1969) as Faustina Fetrenelli
 Gruntovčani (1975) as Špranja
 Kapelski kresovi (1975-1976) as Ivanka
 Nikola Tesla (1977) as Gazdarica
 Smogovci (1982-1997) as Melita Vragec (final appearance)

References

External links
 

1928 births
2020 deaths
Croatian actresses
Croatian television actresses
Croatian film actresses
Croatian stage actresses
Actresses from Zagreb